GMA Headline News is a Philippine television news broadcasting show broadcast by GMA Network. Originally anchored by Tina Monzon-Palma and Jose Mari Velez and later by Leslie Espino and Vicky Morales, it premiered on May 19, 1986 replacing The 11:30 Report. The show concluded on January 3, 1992. It was replaced by GMA Network News in its timeslot.

Anchors
 Tina Monzon-Palma 
 Jose Mari Velez 
 Leslie Espino 
 Vicky Morales 
 Amado Pineda

References

1986 Philippine television series debuts
1992 Philippine television series endings
English-language television shows
GMA Network news shows
Philippine television news shows